Kenneth Smith (21 May 1932 - June 2011) was an English footballer who played as a centre forward.

Smith played league football between 1952 and 1962 for Sunderland, Blackpool, Shrewsbury Town, Gateshead, Darlington, Carlisle United and Halifax Town. He also played non-league football for Headington United and South Shields. He had spells in Canada in 1961 initially with Toronto Ukrainians in the National Soccer League. Later throughout the 1961 season he played in the Eastern Canada Professional Soccer League with Toronto Italia. After leaving Halifax Town in 1962, Smith joined non-league Trowbridge Town.

References

Sources

1932 births
English footballers
Association football forwards
Sunderland A.F.C. players
Oxford United F.C. players
Blackpool F.C. players
Shrewsbury Town F.C. players
Gateshead A.F.C. players
Darlington F.C. players
Carlisle United F.C. players
South Shields F.C. (1936) players
Halifax Town A.F.C. players
Trowbridge Town F.C. players
English Football League players
2011 deaths
Footballers from South Shields
Toronto Italia players
English expatriate sportspeople in Canada
Expatriate soccer players in Canada
English expatriate footballers
Canadian National Soccer League players
Eastern Canada Professional Soccer League players
Toronto Ukrainians players